The Kaohsiung Science Park, also known as Luzhu Science Park, is located in Lujhu District, Kaohsiung, Taiwan. The park was established in 2010.

See also
Tainan Science Park

References

External links
A satellite image at wikimapia

2010 establishments in Taiwan
Buildings and structures in Kaohsiung
Science parks in Taiwan